Perrogney-les-Fontaines is a commune in the Haute-Marne department in north-eastern France.

Geography
The Aujon has its source in the commune.

See also
Communes of the Haute-Marne department

References

Perrogneylesfontaines